Albert Bell (8 February 1898–1973) was an English footballer who played in the Football League for Accrington Stanley, Durham City and Leeds United.

References

1898 births
1973 deaths
English footballers
Association football defenders
English Football League players
Annfield Plain F.C. players
West Stanley F.C. players
Aston Villa F.C. players
Leeds United F.C. players
Accrington Stanley F.C. (1891) players
Durham City A.F.C. players
Consett A.F.C. players